Cissus oblonga is a species of vine native to dry rainforests of Queensland, Australia.

References

oblonga
Flora of Queensland
Bushfood